= The Sex Offender Housing Dilemma =

2018 book by Monica Williams

- Author: Monica Williams
- Publisher: NYU Press
- Publication date: 2018
- Pages: 288
- ISBN: 978-1479836499

The Sex Offender Housing Dilemma: Community Activism, Safety, and Social Justice is a book by Weber State University sociologist Monica Williams.

== Content ==
The book examines community regulation and public policy regarding sex offenders and housing in the United States, which has been generally described by sociologists as disproportionately harsh and emotion-based.

The book starts by examining the topic of anti-sex offender vigilante attacks facilitated by laws that force sex offenders to disclose their addresses to the public. It later explores other forms of nonviolent public responses from communities to sex offenders relocating to their areas, especially those that seek to prohibit sex offenders from living in the community.

== Reception ==
A review on Criminal Justice Review described the book as a "worthwhile read for a graduate course in societal reactions to deviance, the politics of criminal justice, or sex offender policy".
